Akai Teruko (赤井輝子, November 6, 1514 – December 17, 1594) or Myoinni (妙印尼)  was a late-Sengoku period Onna-musha warrior. Teruko was a woman trained in ko-naginata, fought in many battles when younger and commanded three thousand soldiers in Kanayama castle at 70 years old. She was a daughter of Akai Terumitsu, spouse of Yura Shigeru, a retainer of the Hōjō clan, and grandmother of Kaihime.

In contrast to her famous granddaughter, Kaihime, who was known as "The most beautiful woman in east Japan" (東国無双の美人), Teruko was known as ''The strongest woman in the Warring States Period'' (戦国時代最強の女丈夫).

Early life 
Teruko was born as the daughter of Tatebayashi Castle lord Akai Terumitsu. According to legend, Teruko's father saved a young fox from naughty children, and then in the evening an Inari appeared and recommended a location for his castle, drawing a design for the fortifications on the ground by its tail. The castle that Teruko lived during her early life was the target of constant threats from the Uesugi, Takeda and Later Hōjō clans. There are no details about Teruko's life with her father, but it is likely that she was trained in military skills from the early age.

Arrival to the Yura clan 
Terumitsu proposed a political marriage between Teruko and Yura Shigeru, the head of the Yura clan and lord of Kanayama castle in currently Gunma Prefecture. During the marriage to Shigeru, she gave birth to Yura Kunishige and Nagao Akinaga. She had a daughter who married the lord of Oshi castle, Narita Ujinaga, during the wedding Teruko's daughter gave birth to Kaihime.

Teruko's husband, Shigeru, was a warlord who played independence as a Sengoku feudal lord, and switched forces in front of the powerful forces Uesugi and Hojo. The Yura family has been a role of intermediary between the Echiso Alliance, which is the alliance between Uesugi and Hojo. In 1578, Shigeru died of illness, so his son Kunishige took over the leadership of the clan. After her husband's death, Teruko becomes a Buddhist nun by changing her name to Myoin-ni (妙印尼). Because Kunishige proved unable to lead the clan, Myoin-ni (Teruko) acquired substantial political power and acted actively in the administration of her family's domain.

Struggles with Hojo clan 

When Hōjō clan suddenly exhibited hostility against Yura clan in 1584, Yura Kunishige and his brother Nagao Akinaga were captured by the Hōjō of Odawara. The Hōjō's troops marched to took Kanayama castle. Akai Teruko at the age of 71, commanded the defense of the Battle of Kanayama Castle (1584), she led her 3,000 remaining soldiers and resisted over 15 months, and finally under the condition of returning captured leaders Yura clan voluntary opened Kanayama castle

At 76 years old, the Conquest of Odawara (1590) took place. She sided with Toyotomi clan and turn to the retainer of Maeda Toshie with her grandson, Yura Sadashige. Together with Toshiie, Teruko took part in the Siege of Matsuida Castle. Teruko was greatly admired by Hideyoshi and Toshiie for their heroic deeds as a warrior. Hideyoshi gave her as a reward the territory of 5435 koku in Ushiku and she became the owner of Ushiku Castle, but soon she transferred the property to Kunishige.

Later life 
Teruko died in 1594 and was buried in Togetsu-in in Ushiku, Ibaraki Prefecture. She was known as ''The Strongest Woman in the Warring States Period'' (戦国時代最強の女丈夫)

Popular Culture 
She makes appearances in the Samurai Warriors and Nobunaga's Ambition series of games.

See also 
 List of female castellans in Japan

References

External links 
 妙印尼輝子 - The strongest woman in the Sengoku period

Japanese women in warfare
People of Sengoku-period Japan
Women of medieval Japan
16th-century Japanese women
Women in 16th-century warfare
Samurai
16th-century women rulers
1514 births
1594 deaths
Toyotomi retainers